Baron Ferenc Forgách de Ghymes et Gács (1560 – 16 October 1615) was a Hungarian Cardinal of the Roman Catholic Church, who served as archbishop of Esztergom from 1607 to 1615.

Family
The Forgách family was one of the eldest houses of Hungary. Ferenc's parents were Baron Simon Forgách (died 1598) and Orsolya Pemflinger. His father functioned as Master of Cup-bearers. They had ten children (five boys and five girls), including Zsigmond Forgách, Palatine, and Mihály Forgách, a soldier.

Ferenc Forgách was born as a Lutheran. He converted to Roman Catholicism under the influence of his uncle, Ferenc Forgách, who functioned as Bishop of Várad (today: Oradea).

References

Bibliography
Markó, László: A magyar állam főméltóságai Szent Istvántól napjainkig - Életrajzi Lexikon p. 225.  (The High Officers of the Hungarian State from Saint Stephen to the Present Days - A Biographical Encyclopedia) (2nd edition); Helikon Kiadó Kft., 2006, Budapest; .
Szabó de Bártfa, László: A Hunt-Pázmán nemzetségbeli Forgách család története History of the Forgách family from the kindred of Hont-Pázmány; 1910, Esztergom.
Ackermann, Kálmán: Forgách Ferenc bíboros, esztergomi érsek. Budapest, 1918.

1560 births
1615 deaths
17th-century Hungarian cardinals
Converts to Roman Catholicism from Lutheranism
Archbishops of Esztergom
Ferenc, Forgach
Bishops of Nitra